"Sharp as a Needle" is a single by British producer Adrian Sherwood, issued under the moniker "The Barmy Army". It was released in January 1988 by On-U Sound Records and would appear on Barmy Army's sole album The English Disease, released in 1989. Continuing the sports theme established on Tackhead's "The Game", Sherwood released "Sharp as a Needle" single as a tribute to Scottish football player Kenny Dalglish, who is represented on the front cover holding the European Cup.

Formats and track listing 
UK 12" single (ON-U DP 18)
"Sharp as a Needle" (Adrian Sherwood) – 6:27
"England 2 Yugoslavia 0" (Adrian Sherwood, Doug Wimbish, Kishi Yamamoto) – 4:40

Personnel 
Adrian Sherwood – producer

Charts

References 

1988 songs
1988 singles
On-U Sound Records singles
Song recordings produced by Adrian Sherwood
Songs written by Adrian Sherwood